Adrian Guțoaia (born March 10, 1990) is a Romanian professional basketball player for Phoenix Galați in Liga Națională.

References

1990 births
Living people
Centers (basketball)
CSU Asesoft Ploiești players
Romanian men's basketball players
Sportspeople from Galați